Handley is a surname. Notable people with the surname include:

Brian Handley, soccer player
Benjamin Handley (1784–1858), English politician and member of parliament for Boston
Carol Handley, Classics educator
Chris S. Handley, comic collector in United States v. Handley
David Handley (farmer), activist
Dick Handley (1922—2012), American football player
Elizabeth Handley-Seymour (c. 1873–1948), English fashion designer
Eric Handley CBE (1926–2013), professor of Greek at Cambridge and University College, London
George Handley (disambiguation), multiple people, including
 George Handley (politician) (1752–1793), American politician, Governor of Georgia, 1788–1789:
 George Handley (footballer, born 1868) (1868–1938), English footballer
 George Handley (footballer, born 1886) (1886–1952), English footballer
 George Handley (footballer, born 1912) (1912–1943), English footballer
 George B. Handley, professor of humanities at Brigham Young University
Harold W. Handley, Indiana governor
Jody Handley, English footballer
Joe Handley, premier of Northwest Territories, Canada
Lee Handley (1913–1970), Major League baseball player
Paul M. Handley, American journalist, wrote The King Never Smiles (biography of Thai King Bhumibol)
Ray Handley, American football coach
Taylor Handley, actor
Tommy Handley, comedian
Vernon Handley, conductor
Wayne Handley, airshow performer
Wal Handley, motorcycle racer

English-language surnames